Alberto Gallinetta (born 16 April 1992) is an Italian football player who plays as a goalkeeper for Polisportiva Lunano.

Club career

Early career
Born in Giussano, Italy, Gallinetta began his career within the youth academy of F.C. Internazionale Milano, where he remained until 2011, although he spent the 2009–10 campaign on loan with the youth squad at Serie B side U.S. Sassuolo Calcio. After returning to Inter prior to the 2011–12 statistical season, his contract was not renewed and Gallinetta joined fellow Serie A outfit, Parma shortly thereafter, as a free agent in July 2011.

Parma F.C.
On from signing with the Emilia-Romagna-based club, the young goalkeeper spent his first season with the Primavera (under-20) team, before being loaned out to FeralpiSalò on 7 July 2012. During the 2013 winter transfer market, however, Parma sold Gallinetta to Serie A champions Juventus in a co-ownership deal in -year contract, in a direct cashless swap with Filippo Boniperti. Both 50% registration rights of the players were tagged for €1 million.

Gallinetta was recalled from his loan spell with FeralpiSalò after 16 league appearances (plus 2 appearances in the league cup and listed as an unused bench in the last game), though he did not officially join Juventus' rosters until 1 July 2013.

Juventus
After signing Gallinetta during the 2012–13 winter transfer market on a co-ownership deal from Parma, he officially joined Juventus on 1 July 2013.

On 28 August 2013, Gallinetta was loaned to Chieti on a season-long deal that expired on 30 June 2014. On 18 June 2014 Boniperti went to Parma outright for another €700,000, with Gallinetta also went to Juventus outright for €700,000.

On 1 January 2015 Gallinetta was signed by Slovenian club ND Gorica in a temporary deal, which was confirmed on 9 January. He also trained with the club since 4 September 2014.

In 2015–16 season, he left for Belgian club  Cercle Brugge, and then Maltese club Naxxar Lions.

In 2016–17 season, he added one more year to his current contract (to 2018), but loaned to Italian Lega Pro club Santarcangelo at the same time.

His contract expired at the end of the 2017–18 season, and he became a free agent.

References

External links
 FIGC profile
 

1992 births
Living people
People from Giussano
Italian footballers
Association football goalkeepers
Inter Milan players
Parma Calcio 1913 players
Juventus F.C. players
ND Gorica players
Cercle Brugge K.S.V. players
Naxxar Lions F.C. players
Santarcangelo Calcio players
Ravenna F.C. players
Serie C players
Slovenian PrvaLiga players
Challenger Pro League players
Campionato Sammarinese di Calcio players
Italian expatriate footballers
Italian expatriate sportspeople in Belgium
Expatriate footballers in Belgium
Italian expatriate sportspeople in Slovenia
Expatriate footballers in Slovenia
Expatriate footballers in Malta
Italy youth international footballers
A.C. Meda 1913 players
Footballers from Lombardy
Sportspeople from the Province of Monza e Brianza